Abortion in Montana is legal. The number of abortion clinics in Montana has fluctuated over the years, with twenty in 1982, twelve in 1992, eight providers of which seven were clinics in 2011, and five clinics in 2014.  There were four clinics from 2015 to February 2018 when All Families Healthcare clinic in Whitefish reopened. There were 1,690 legal abortions in 2014, and 1,611 in 2015.

History

Legislative history 
In 1997, the Montana Legislature passed a law that said only physicians could perform abortions. After a lawsuit, they changed the law to allow nurse practitioners to perform abortions.

As of 2017, California, Oregon, Montana, Vermont, and New Hampshire allow qualified non-physician health professionals, such as physicians' assistants, nurse practitioners, and certified nurse midwives, to do first-trimester aspiration abortions and to prescribe drugs for medical abortions. As of May 1, 2018, there were no major legal restrictions on abortions.

As of May 14, 2019, the Montana Legislature prohibited abortions after the fetus was viable, generally some point between week 24 and 28. This period uses a standard defined by the Supreme Court of the United States in 1973 with the Roe v. Wade ruling. In 2018, advanced practice clinicians were legally allowed to provide abortion services.  This group included  physician assistants, certified nurse midwives, and advanced practice nurses.

In November 2022, Montana voters rejected a measure that would have given embryos and fetuses legal personhood status.

Judicial history 
The Supreme Court of the United States' decision in 1973's Roe v. Wade ruling meant the state could no longer regulate abortion in the first trimester. However, the Supreme Court overturned Roe v. Wade in Dobbs v. Jackson Women's Health Organization,  later in 2022.

In 1997, All Families Healthcare took the state to court to challenge its law stating that only physicians could perform abortions. In April 2018, two nurses succeeded in getting an injunction as part of a lawsuit against the state to try to allow advanced practice nurses to perform abortions. Montana's Attorney General Tim Fox appealed the injunction.

Clinic history 

Between 1982 and 1992, the number of abortion clinics in the state decreased by eight, going from twenty in 1982 to twelve in 1992. All Families Healthcare opened in 1994.

On March 29, 1993, at the Blue Mountain Clinic in Missoula, Montana, at around 1 a.m., an arsonist snuck onto the premises and firebombed the clinic. The perpetrator, a Washington man, was ultimately caught, convicted and imprisoned. The facility was a near-total loss, but all of the patients' records, though damaged, survived the fire in metal file cabinets.

In 2011, there were eight abortion providers in the state, of which seven were classified as abortion clinics. In 2014, there were five abortion clinics in the state. 93% of the counties in the state did not have an abortion clinic. That year, 55% of women in the state aged 15–44 lived in a county without an abortion clinic. In March 2016, there were five Planned Parenthood clinics in the state. 

In 2017, there were five Planned Parenthood clinics in a state with a population of 215,806 women aged 15–49 of which four offered abortion services. In 2018, the closest abortion clinics to Flathead Valley were in Missoula, Great Falls, Helena or Billings.  These were all over 100 miles away, requiring women to travel great distances to have an abortion.  All Families Healthcare clinic in Whitefish closed for four years in early 2015, before reopening in February 2018.

Statistics 

In the period between 1972 and 1974, there were zero recorded illegal abortion death in the state. In 1990, 84,000 women in the state faced the risk of an unintended pregnancy. Between 2011 and 2014, the abortion rate in Montana declined 26%. In 2013, among white women aged 15–19, there were 180 abortions, 0 abortions for black women aged 15–19, 10 abortions for Hispanic women aged 15–19, and 0 abortions for women of all other races. In 2014, 56% of Montana adults said in a poll by the Pew Research Center that abortion should be legal while 38% believed it should be illegal in all or most cases. In 2017, the state had an infant mortality rate of 5.4 deaths per 1,000 live births.

Abortion financing 
Seventeen states including Montana use their own funds to cover all or most "medically necessary" abortions sought by low-income women under Medicaid, thirteen of which are required by State court orders to do so. In 2010, the state had 422 publicly funded abortions, of which were 5 federally funded and 417 were state funded.

In 2018, women in Flathead Valley were waiting for insurance companies to pay for IUDs or implants.  While waiting for the company to pay, they got pregnant and ended up getting an abortion.

Abortion rights views and activities

Clinic protection 
Around 100 volunteers support All Families Healthcare. This included driving women long distances for appointments, escorting patients inside and shoveling the sidewalk outside the clinic.

Protests 
Women from the state participated in marches supporting abortion rights as part of a #StoptheBans movement in May 2019.

Anti-abortion views and activities

Activities 
In 2018, anti-abortion rights activists regularly protested outside All Families Healthcare.

References 

Montana
Healthcare in Montana
Women in Montana